Diego Pozzetto was an Italian stage and film actor.

Selected filmography

 Bertoldo, Bertoldino e Cacasenno (1937)
 Nina non far la stupida (1937)
 Il conte di Brechard (1938)
 The Black Corsair (1938)
 L'argine (1938) - (uncredited)
 Star of the Sea (1938)
 Marionetes (1939) - (uncredited)
 Tre fratelli in gamba (1939)
 Guest for One Night (1939) - Mattia
 Men on the Sea Floor (1941) - (uncredited)
 Fatal Symphony (1947)
 Se fossi deputato (1949)
 Margaret of Cortona (1950)
 Cavalcade of Heroes (1950)
 Angelo tra la folla (1950)
 Feathers in the Wind (1950)
 Love and Blood (1951) - Il storpio
 Shadows Over Naples (1951) - Der Behinderte
 Trieste mia! (1951)
 Maschera nera (1951)
 When in Rome (1952) - Bearded Priest (uncredited)
 Prisoner in the Tower of Fire (1953) - Frate Raimondo
 Südliche Nächte (1953)
 Disonorata - Senza colpa (1954)
 Disowned (1954)
 Vecchio cinema... che passione! (1957)
 Aphrodite, Goddess of Love (1958) - Frantic Old Man (uncredited)
 Avventura nell'arcipelago (1958) - Professore Bellini
 Herod the Great (1959)
 Il cavaliere senza terra (1959)
 Head of a Tyrant (1959)
 Il mondo dei miracoli (1959)
 Ben-Hur (1959) - Villager (uncredited)
 Ursus in the Land of Fire (1963)
 The Last Gun (1964) - Noah
 Hercules and the Tyrants of Babylon (1964) - Bomar - Babylonian Commander (final film role)

References

Bibliography
 Roberto Chiti & Roberto Poppi. Dizionario del cinema italiano: Dal 1945 al 1959. Gremese Editore, 1991.

External links

1893 births
Year of death unknown
Italian male film actors
Italian male stage actors
Actors from Trieste